There have been several men titled Archduke Ferdinand of Austria, including:

Ferdinand I, Archduke of Austria (1503–1564), who later ascended to the title of the Holy Roman Emperor
Ferdinand II, Archduke of Inner Austria (1578–1637), who later ascended to the title of the Holy Roman Emperor
Ferdinand III, Archduke of Inner Austria (1608–1657), who later ascended to the title of the Holy Roman Emperor
Ferdinand IV, Archduke of Austria (1633–1654), who later ascended to the title of the King of the Romans, heir to the title of the Holy Roman Emperor
Archduke Franz Ferdinand Karl Ludwig Joseph (1863–1914), better known as Franz Ferdinand, was Heir to the Austrian throne from 1896 until he was assassinated in 1914, sparking World War I

Others who have held the title:
Ferdinand II, Archduke of Further Austria (1529–1595)
Ferdinand, Prince of Asturias (1571–1578)
Cardinal-Infante Ferdinand of Austria (1609/1610–1641)
Archduke Ferdinand Karl Anton Joseph Johann Stanislaus of Austria-Este (1754–1806), fourth son and fourteenth child of Holy Roman Emperor Francis I and Maria Theresa, commander of an Austrian army in the War of the Third Coalition
Archduke Ferdinand Joseph Johann Baptist (1769–1824), second son of Holy Roman Emperor Leopold II, became Grand Duke Ferdinand III of Tuscany
Archduke Ferdinand Karl Joseph of Austria-Este (1781–1850), younger son of Archduke Ferdinand Karl Anton Joseph Johann Stanislaus.
Archduke Ferdinand Karl Leopold Joseph Franz Marcelin (1793–1875), eldest son of Holy Roman Emperor Francis II, became Emperor Ferdinand I of Austria upon his father's death in 1835
Archduke Ferdinand Karl Viktor of Austria-Este (1821–1849), younger son of Duke Francis IV of Modena
Archduke Ferdinand Maximilian Joseph (1832–1867), second son of Archduke Franz Karl of Austria and brother of Emperor Franz Josef of Austria; became Emperor Maximilian I of Mexico in 1864
Archduke Ferdinand Karl Ludwig Joseph Johann Maria (1868–1915), younger brother of Archduke Franz Ferdinand, abandoned his dynastic rights to marry Bertha Czuber in 1909
Archduke Ferdinand of Austria (HI & RH, 1918–2004), married to Countess Helene (1937– ), only daughter of HIllH Carl Theodor, Count zu Toerring-Jettenbach and HRH Princess Elizabeth of Greece and Denmark (a sister of Princess Marina, Duchess of Kent)
Archduke Ferdinand Zvonimir of Austria (born 1997), son of Archduke Karl of Austria, grandson of Crown Prince Otto of Austria, second-in-line to the headship of the House of Habsburg